Satyameva Jayate 2 is a 2021 Indian Hindi-language vigilante action thriller film written and directed by Milap Zaveri with production by T-Series and Emmay Entertainment. Based on the fight against injustice and misuse of power, it is an official spiritual sequel of the 2018 film Satyameva Jayate and stars John Abraham in a triple role alongside Divya Khosla Kumar, Rajeev Pillai and Anup Soni in important characters. The release date was postponed due to rise in COVID-19 cases. The film released on 25 November 2021. Unlike the original, it was a major commercial failure.

Plot 
Satya Balram Azad is the home minister in a coalition government in Uttar Pradesh. He tries to pass an anti-corruption bill in the assembly but his own alliance partners oppose. Interestingly, one of the MLA who votes against the bill is Satya's wife, Vidya Azad. She is the daughter of Chandra Prakash, the Chief Minister of Uttar Pradesh. Meanwhile, the doctors in a government hospital in the state go on strike. A mother pleads them to treat her daughter who has met with an accident. The doctor leading the strike refuses. The victim dies in front of the protesting doctors and media. The same night, a vigilante, kills the doctor leading the strike in an act of revenge. His death leads to the strike being withdrawn. The vigilante becomes an overnight hero. Chandra Prakash is not impressed and he tells DCP Upadhyaya to find the culprit. The DCP hands over the case to Jay Balram Azad, twin brother of Satya Balram Azaad. On the other hand, another scandal rocks the state as many children fall ill after consuming a meal in a Madrasa. In the government hospital where they are admitted, there's shortage of oxygen cylinders. Hence, 40 of those kids die. Satya finds out that the spoilt foodgrains were supplied by a relative of Tripathi. And the one responsible to supply oxygen in the government hospital is a close aide of Shankar Prasad. Both Tripathi and Shankar are from the alliance party and they threaten to withdraw support when Satya confronts them. It now comes to light that the vigilante is none other than Satya. He now kills both Tripathi and Shankar. A few days later, a third incident occurs as a flyover in the state collapses. The contractor of the flyover, Madan Lal Joshi refuses to take responsibility. Jay and others conclude that he's going to get killed by the vigilante. What happens next forms the rest of the film.

Cast

 John Abraham in a triple role as Activist Dadasaheb Balram Azad,  Home Minister Satya Balram Azad and ACP Jay Balram Azad IPS
 Divya Khosla Kumar as MLA Vidya Maurya Azad, Satya's wife
 Harsh Chhaya as Chief Minister Chandra Prakash Maurya, Vidya's father
 Anup Soni as DCP Subodh Upadhyay IPS
 Gautami Kapoor as Suhasini Devi Azad
 Sahil Vaid as Gyaneshwar Chaurasia
  Zakir Hussain as Shankar Prasad Yadav
 Rituraj Singh as Madan Lal Joshi
 Rajendra Gupta as Daya Kaka
 Bhagyashree Limaye as Doctor
 Shaad Randhawa as Sardara
 Daya Shankar Pandey as Parag Tripathi
 Salim Shah as Yashwant Paswan
 Jass Manak as himself performing his hit song "Tenu Lehanga" at a function.
 Nora Fatehi in a special appearance in the song "Kusu Kusu"
 Shubh Saxena and Shresth Saxena as Young Jay & Satya

Production

Principal photography for Satyameva Jayate 2 commenced on 20 October 2020 in Lucknow, before moving to Mumbai and Raebareli. Filming wrapped up in the last week of January 2021 in Mumbai.

Soundtrack 

The film's music was composed by  Arko, Rochak Kohli, Tanishk Bagchi, Payal Dev and Jass Manak while lyrics written by Manoj Muntashir,  Rashmi Virag, Tanishk Bagchi and Jass Manak.

The first song "Meri Zindagi Hai Tu" is remake from Nusrat Fateh Ali Khan's song with same name. Lyrics by Nasir Kazmi. 

The song "Tenu Lehanga" is a remake of the 2019 Punjabi song "Lehanga" by Jass Manak. 

The song "Kusu Kusu" is a remake of Islamic song "Muhammad Nabina".

Release
As of April 2021, the release date of film has been postponed due to rise in COVID-19 cases. Finally, film was released on 25 November 2021.

Reception

Box office 
Satyameva Jayate 2 earned 3.22 crore at the box office on its opening day. On the second day, the film collected 1.92 crore. On the third day, the film collected 2.12 crore. On the fourth day, the film collected 2.50 crore, with the total domestic opening weekend collection becoming 9.76 crore.

, the film grossed  crore in India and  crore overseas, for a worldwide gross collection of  crore.

Critical response 
The film received negative reviews from critics. Bollywood Hungama gave the film a rating of 4/5 and wrote, ‘‘Satyameva Jayate 2 is a power packed mass entertainer with entertaining moments and bravura performance by John Abraham’’. Hiren Kotwani of The Times of India gave the film a rating of 3/5 and wrote, ‘‘If you enjoy the massy masala fare of the bygone era and are willing to take on thrice as much of John Abraham in one frame, you can go indulge in this one’’. Murtuza Nullwala of Eastern Eye gave the film a rating of 2/5 and wrote, ‘‘Satyameva Jayate 2 is an outdated film and doesn’t entertain much’’. Anupama Chopra of Film Companion wrote, ‘‘Satyameva Jayate 2 starts with a visual of the Tricolor and then over the next 138 minutes, the film batters us with ear-splitting background music, grotesque visuals, feeble dialogues that are desperate to land punches and superbly hammy acting’’. Sonil Dedhia of News 18 criticized the film by calling its script ‘‘Tacky’’ and  wrote, ‘‘My biggest question is why did the producers decide to put their hard-earned money into this project when Zaveri is known to make the tackiest of films’’. Tatsam Mukherjee of Firstpost gave the film a rating of 0/5 and wrote, ‘‘Satyamev Jayate 2 is an ugly exhibition of appeasement filmmaking, where a director is trying to tick off as many boxes of the audience he can appease, using the most tired tropes in the history of Hindi cinema’’.

Shubhra Gupta from The Indian Express gave the film a rating of 0.5/5 and wrote, ‘‘Abraham strides through this thing with his standard mix of fixed-frown-and-swinging-fists. Only once or twice does he do the bare-bodied superhero who can take on all comers with a teeny dimpled nudge-wink. The rest is a string of tired stereotypes and bad story-telling, refreshing the dangerous idea of justice being doled out by men arrogating to themselves the power to judge, jury, executioner’’. Saibal Chatterjee from NDTV gave the film a rating of 1/5 and criticized the soundtrack, dialogues and the characters of the film by writing, ‘‘The soundtrack is shoddy and ear-splitting. The dialogues are clearly the handiwork of a third-rate rhymester. The characters do not speak, they howl’’. He further stated, ‘‘The shoddy cinematic qualities are only one aspect of Satyameva Jayate 2; The film also peddles dangerous ideas about instant justice and patriotism. No Hindi film in living memory has misused the tricolour as brazenly as Satyameva Jayate 2 does; The film invokes the national flag for the purpose of justifying extra-judicial means of punishing the corrupt. In the bargain, all that it does is sully the fair reputation of the world's largest democracy’’. Monika Rawal Kukreja of Hindustan Times called Satyameva Jayate 2 a ‘‘loud, screeching, bloated mess’’ and a ‘‘film no one should have to tolerate’’. She wrote, ‘‘There's not even a single person that's talking in this film. Everyone is shouting, screaming and yelling at the top of their lungs, leaving your eardrums craving for some calm. Satyameva Jayate 2 is a shoddy and sloppy depiction of jingoism and vigilantism at its most shameless’’.

Stutee Ghosh from The Quint gave the film a rating of 1/5 and wrote, ‘‘Satyameva Jayate 2 is all noise and no substance’’. She further stated, ‘‘Satyameva Jayate 2 is mind-bogglingly, excruciatingly loud, on-the-nose, screechy and melodramatic’’. Syed Firdaus Ashraf of Rediff gave the film a rating of 1.5/5 and criticized its script by stating, ‘‘Satyamev Jayate 2 has a dated circa 1990s script which won't find acceptance with today's generations’’. He further wrote, ‘‘The only saving grace in the film is a passable item song Kusu Kusu performed by Nora Fatehi’’. Anuj Kumar from The Hindu wrote, ‘‘Despite being soaked in blood and tears, the cases of injustice have been so mechanically handled that they fail to evoke any empathy for the characters; So much so that even references to the secular fabric of society and women’s safety sound gratuitous’’. Nandini Ramnath from  Scroll wrote, ‘‘The director Zaveri throws everything in his powers at his barren canvas. The dialogue is screamed rather than spoken and competes with the blaring background music. By shooting the same scene from ten angles and deploying rapid zooms and editing gimmicks, Zaveri hopes that the rampant tackiness will not be apparent’’.

References 

 https://emiratefix.com/
 https://charmdownloader.com

External links 
 
 
 https://emiratefix.com/
 https://charmdownloader.com

Indian vigilante films
Indian action films
Indian sequel films
Films directed by Milap Zaveri
Films shot in Lucknow
Films scored by Arko Pravo Mukherjee
Films scored by Rochak Kohli
Films scored by Tanishk Bagchi
Films scored by Payal Dev
Films scored by Jass Manak
Hindi-language action films
2021 action thriller films